The Afghanistan War Commission is a bipartisan task force set up to study the entirety of U.S. military operations in Afghanistan from 2001 to 2021.  This commission was formally authorized as part of the 2022 National Defense Authorization Act.

The commission will spend four years studying all aspects of the U.S. involvement in Afghanistan, including military operations, the efforts of non-military government organizations, and the cooperation between those actors. The commission will draft a report of its findings, styled after the 9/11 Commission Report.

Members 
Four members of this commission were nominated by the Congressional Armed Services Committees:
 Colin Jackson, chair of Naval War College's Strategic and Operational Research Department
 Jeremy Bash, former chief of staff for the Department of Defense
 Michael Allen, former special assistant to President George W. Bush
 Michael Lumpkin, president of Amida Technology Solutions

Other commission members:

 Shamila Chaudhary- American foreign policy expert, Senior Advisor at Johns Hopkins University School of Advanced International Studies
 Luke Hartig- President of National Journal Research, former Senior Director for Counterterrorism at the National Security Council under Obama Administration
 Robert Ashley- Retired Army Lieutenant General and the 21st Director of the Defense Intelligence Agency (DIA)
 Laurel Miller- Former acting Special Representative for Afghanistan and Pakistan at the U.S. Department of State from 2013-2017
 Andrew Wilder- Vice President of Asia Programs at United States Institute for Peace, previously served as director of Afghanistan and Pakistan Programs
 Anand Gopal- Author of “No Good Men Among the Living: America, the Taliban and the War Through Afghan Eyes”
 Seth Jones- Previously served as a plans officer and advisor to the Commanding General, U.S. Special Operations Forces, in Afghanistan (Combined Forces Special Operations Component Command–Afghanistan)
 Christopher Molino- Army Captain who served during Operation Iraqi freedom, received Silver Star
 Ryan Crocker- Former U.S. Ambassador to Afghanistan (2011-2012)
 Jeffrey Dressler- Served as Professional Staff Member for the House Foreign Affairs Committee (Terrorism, Nonproliferation, and Trade Subcommittee) from 2013-2015, was National Security Advisor to both Paul Ryan (2017-2019) and Kevin McCarthy (2015-2017)
 Daniel P. Fata- 25 years of experience working in Congress (as a leadership staffer in both the House and Senate), and at the Department of Defense (as deputy assistant secretary of defense for Europe and NATO)
 Bob Taft- former Ohio Governor

References 

United_States_national_commissions
War_in_Afghanistan_(2001–2021)